Dún Laoghaire–Rathdown Waves, also referred to as DLR Waves is an Irish association football club based in Dún Laoghaire–Rathdown. It was originally founded in 2012. The club enters teams in the FAI Women's Cup and the Women's National League. Between 2014 and 2018, following a merger, with UCD, the club played as UCD Waves. However in 2018 UCD withdrew from the WNL. DLR Waves was subsequently revived as a separate club, taking UCD Waves' place in the WNL.

History

Early years
The 2012–13 season saw DLR Waves join the Women's National League as an expansion team. The  club was formed with the support of the Dún Laoghaire–Rathdown County Council and they played their home games at Jackson Park, Kilternan. DLR Waves were managed by former UCD coach, Larry Mahony, and their squad featured former UCD captain Sylvia Gee. Initially DLR Waves had mixed success in the WNL. During the 2012–13 season they finished fifth. They were also FAI Women's Cup semi-finalists.

Merger with UCD
Between 2014 and 2018, following a merger, with UCD, the club played as UCD Waves. However in 2018 UCD withdrew from the WNL. DLR Waves was subsequently revived as a separate club, taking UCD Waves' place in the WNL.

Players

Current squad

Former players

Coaching Staff

References

External links
 DLR Waves on Facebook
  DLR Waves on Twitter

  
Women's association football clubs in the Republic of Ireland
Association football clubs in Dún Laoghaire–Rathdown
Women's National League (Ireland) teams
Association football clubs established in 2012
2012 establishments in Ireland